The Criollos de Caguas are a baseball team in the Puerto Rican Professional Baseball League. Based in the city of Caguas, they have won 20 national titles and five Caribbean World Series, including the 2017-2018 back-to-back championships.

From the mid-1940s until roughly 1970, the team was known as Caguas-Guayama and was jointly based in Caguas and in a nearby city, Guayama.

Puerto Rico Baseball League
On November 18, 2009, the Gigantes defeated the Criollos. After beginning the season with three consecutive losses, the Leones defeated the Criollos to win their first game. On November 22, 2009, the Leones defeated the Criollos by nine runs. On November 29, 2009, the Criollos defeated the Indios in a game that was shortened due to rain. In the first week of December, the team's reinforcement players, Iván Rodríguez, Yonder Alonso, Luis Villareal and Horacio Ramírez began joining the roster. On December 1, 2009, the Criollos traded Héctor Pellot to the Lobos in exchange of Adrián Ortiz, who the team's general manager, Frankie Thon, intended to employ as pinch runner. The team also released Quintin Berry and placed Helder Velázquez and Luis Cruz in the inactive list, opening places for the reinforcement players. On December 1, 2009, the Criollos defeated the Gigantes to win their first home game of the season. Earlier that day, Alex Cora began practicing with the team, seeking a spot in the roster.

2022 Caribbean Series roster

References

External links
Official site

1938 establishments in Puerto Rico
Liga de Béisbol Profesional Roberto Clemente
Professional baseball teams in Puerto Rico
Caguas, Puerto Rico
Baseball teams established in 1938